AlpInvest Partners is a global private equity asset manager with over $85 billion of committed capital since inception as of December 31, 2022.  The firm invests on behalf of more than 450 institutional investors from North America, Asia, Europe, South America and Africa.

AlpInvest operates three investment teams focused on private equity: Primary Fund Investments, Secondary and Portfolio Finance investments and Co-Investments.

AlpInvest pursues investment opportunities across the entire spectrum of private equity including: large buyout, middle-market buyout, private credit, venture capital, growth capital, mezzanine, distressed and energy investments, including sustainable energy investments.

As of the end of 2022, the firm had invested in more than 600 private equity funds managed by more than 325 private equity firms.  According to the PEI 300, AlpInvest ranked among the 50 largest private equity firms globally.

Since 2011, AlpInvest has operated as a subsidiary of The Carlyle Group, a global private equity firm.  Prior to 2011, AlpInvest has been owned through a joint venture of its two clients, the Dutch pension funds (ABP and PFZW).

Founded in 2000, AlpInvest has offices in New York, Amsterdam, London, Hong Kong, San Francisco, Indianapolis, Singapore and Tokyo with over 100 investment professionals and over 175 employees.

Investment Programs

With over $55 billion of funds under management, AlpInvest is one of the largest investors in the private equity asset class globally.  AlpInvest pursues investment opportunities across the entire spectrum of private equity including: large buyout, middle-market buyout, venture capital, growth capital, mezzanine, distressed and sustainable energy investments.  AlpInvest also invests across the range of private equity investment channels:
 Primary fund investments
 Secondary investments
 Co-investments

AlpInvest invests primarily in private equity limited partnerships and effectively acts as a fund investor, making commitments to private equity funds globally.  Among the most notable firms with which AlpInvest is invested include: Kohlberg Kravis Roberts, Blackstone Group, Providence Equity Partners and TPG Capital as well as many of the leading middle-market private equity firms and venture capital firms.

AlpInvest will invest with these firms either by making commitments to new investment funds or by purchasing funds through the private equity secondary market.  AlpInvest is one of the largest private equity fund investors and is also among the largest and most active and experienced investors in private equity secondaries.

AlpInvest also invests directly alongside some of the largest private equity investors through an active co-investment program and will make mezzanine debt investments into companies owned by financial sponsors.

Following this spin-off of its European middle market leveraged buyout platform, which was subsequently renamed Taros Capital AlpInvest, by itself, no longer makes control investments directly in privately held companies, but rather invests alongside selected private equity managers.

History

AlpInvest as it is currently known, was established in 2000 as an initiative by its two sponsors, the Dutch pension funds ABP and PFZW (then PGGM), to create an independent and professional manager for their private equity allocations.

AlpInvest's predecessor, NIB Capital Private Equity, originally operated as one integrated investment firm with distinct teams focusing on fund investments as well as lead buyout investments in mid-sized companies located in the Benelux and Germany.  As the firm evolved, AlpInvest shifted its focus toward an expansion of its investment management business.

In 2000, AlpInvest expanded its investment platform, by creating a dedicated equity co-investment team to invest in transactions alongside its core private equity managers.  The following year, in 2001, the firm began a formal effort to make mezzanine investments.  A year later, in 2002, AlpInvest launched a secondary investment platform, which has emerged as one of the largest buyers of private equity assets in the secondaries market.

Milestones

The following is a timeline of significant milestones:

 1980s - Both ABP and PGGM begin separate in-house private equity investment programs, investing primarily in private equity funds.
 1990s - Alpinvest Holding N.V., an evergreen investment fund, is founded and Stan Vermeulen is named CEO in 1993.  Alpinvest Holding N.V. provided private equity and mezzanine capital to middle market companies in Benelux and Germany until its acquisition by ABP and PGGM in 2000.
 1997 - Alpinvest Holding N.V. begins trading on the Amsterdam Stock Exchange on 11 June 1997. Major shareholders in Alpinvest Holding N.V. included the Dutch government and ABN Amro Bank NV.
 1999 - ABP and PGGM form NIB Capital Private Equity, the predecessor of AlpInvest under the leadership of Volkert Doeksen, in order to increase position in the private equity market.  NIB Capital is formed from several separate teams from NIB Bank NV and Parnib Holding NV.
 2000 - Alpinvest Holding N.V. is acquired by ABP and PGGM, and integrated into Parnib Holding N.V. and NIB Capital Private Equity to form what would become AlpInvest Partners. ABP and PGGM topped a bid from GIMV to acquire the listed investment fund.  NIB Capital receives its first mandate of €13 billion from ABP and PGGM of which close to €7 billion is designated for new investments in the period 2000–2002.  The remainder comprised existing investments made by ABP, PGGM and NIB Capital's predecessors.
 2000 - AlpInvest changes its name to NIB Capital Private Equity and begins a dedicated equity co-investment group.
 2001 - NIB Capital opens New York office.
 2002 - NIB Capital begins a dedicated secondary investment effort with a €1 billion mandate.
 2003 - NIB Capital receives a new €7 billion mandate from ABP and PGGM, covering the period 2003–2005, for fund investments, secondary investments, co-investments and lead investments in the Benelux/German mid-market.

 2004 - NIB Capital Private Equity spun out to ABP and PGGM and renamed "AlpInvest Partners".
 2006 - AlpInvest receives a new investment mandate from ABP and PGGM initially amounting to €11 billion, covering the period 2006–2008 (the mandate size increased over time).  This represented one of the largest mandates ever granted in the international private equity markets.
 2006 - AlpInvest spins off its European middle market buyout business, which is subsequently renamed Taros Capital in order to focus exclusively on investments in private equity funds and alongside relationship financial sponsors.
 2006 - AlpInvest opens its first Asian office in Hong Kong.
 2007 - AlpInvest receives a €2 billion mandate to invest in global mezzanine debt transactions and a €500 million Cleantech investment covering the period 2007–2009.
 2008 - AlpInvest opens London office.
 2011 - AlpInvest acquired by a joint venture between management and The Carlyle Group
 2013 - AlpInvest raises $4.2 billion of investor commitments for its AlpInvest Secondaries Fund V
 2013 - The Carlyle Group acquires 100% ownership interest in AlpInvest
 2017 - AlpInvest raised $6.5 billion of investor commitments for its AlpInvest Secondaries Fund VI
 2020 - AlpInvest raised $9 billion of investor commitments for its AlpInvest Secondaries Fund VII 
 2021 - AlpInvest raised $3.5 billion for its AlpInvest Co-Investment Fund VIII

Awards
In recent years, AlpInvest has won several industry awards as a limited partner.

Private equity fund investments
AlpInvest is among the largest investors in private equity funds, globally, historically allocating as much as €4 billion per year to leveraged buyout (large-cap, middle-market, lower middle market), venture capital and special situations funds, among other strategies.  AlpInvest maintains relationships with many of the leading managers in difficult to access segments of private equity.  In many cases, AlpInvest is a strategic investor and tends to be among the largest investors in each fund in which it invests.  AlpInvest's funds team is made up of more than 25 professionals based globally in Europe, North America and Asia.

Secondary investments 
AlpInvest's secondary investments group focuses on the purchase of existing portfolios of private equity assets.

In the secondary market, AlpInvest operates as an independent investment group with a large dedicated team, comparable to other secondary firms and is one of the largest buyers of private equity assets in the secondaries market.  AlpInvest's secondary investments include purchases of limited partnership interests, spin-outs of captive private equity groups, stapled secondary transactions, securitizations, joint ventures and secondary direct transactions.

Although most secondary transactions are kept confidential, the following transactions have been disclosed:

Private equity and mezzanine co-investments
AlpInvest traditionally invests alongside leading financial sponsors in leveraged buyouts and growth capital transactions. Since inception, AlpInvest has invested more than €3 billion in over 100 transactions and is among the most active co-investors in private equity transactions.  The firm's dedicated co-investment team is made up of more than 25 professionals across its equity and mezzanine products operating in Europe, North America and Asia.

The following is a list of selected notable companies that AlpInvest has invested in alongside other private equity general partners, either as an equity co-investor or as a mezzanine debt provider:

Source: AlpInvest website

Investors and beneficiaries
AlpInvest's primary beneficiaries are the 4.8 million participants in the pension funds Stichting Pensioenfonds ABP (ABP) and Stichting Pensioenfonds Zorg en Welzijn (PFZW, formerly PGGM), both based in the Netherlands.

ABP and PFZW collectively had assets of over $500 billion as of December 31, 2012 and are among the largest pension funds in the world.

Prior to 2011, AlpInvest had not historically solicited capital from other investors or institutions.  Following its spinout from the Dutch pension funds, AlpInvest has been actively raising capital from institutional investors in North America, Europe, Asia, South America and Africa.

Among AlpInvest's most notable U.S. clients are Municipal Employees' Retirement System of Michigan (MERS) and Indiana Public Retirement System (INPRS).

See also

Private Equity
Fund of funds
Secondaries
Co-Investment
Distressed investments
ESG
Growth capital
Leveraged buyout
Limited partner
Mezzanine capital
Private credit
Sustainable energy
Venture capital

Notes

References

AlpInvest Partners N.V.: Private Company Information (BusinessWeek)
 Volkert Doeksen: Financial News 100 Most influential people 2006 (#56)
 AlpInvest Partners Presentation for Netspar 12 June 2007
Firms seek a better class of investor(eFinancialNews, 2008)
 AlpInvest receives €2bn mezzanine mandate from ABP, PGGM (AltAssets, 2007)
 AlpInvest cuts support for buyout firms (DowJones Financial News, 2007)
 Dutch Treat (TheDeal.com, 2003)
Speech:Volkert Doeksen, The French Senate.  AFIC's Annual Conference on Private Equity, Monday April 3, 2006.
Europeans step up to global battlefield Private Equity News, p. 13-16
AlpInvest 2008 Annual Review, 2008 Annual Report
AlpInvest 2009 Annual Review, 2009 Annual Report

External links

AlpInvest Partners (official website)

Private equity firms of the Netherlands
Private equity secondary market
Companies based in Amsterdam
Multinational companies headquartered in the Netherlands
Financial services companies established in 2000
Alternative investment management companies
Mezzanine capital investment firms